Matvey Yuryevich Ganapolsky (born Margolis; , ; born 14 December 1953 in Lviv) is a Russian and Ukrainian journalist who has contributed for Pryamiy kanal, Echo of Moscow, Moskovsky Komsomolets, and other media. He is also a member of the Russian Jewish Congress.

Biography
Ganapolsky was born in Lviv in 1953. His mother Dina Levina was one of the last surviving eyewitnesses of the Babi Yar tragedy. Ganapolsky spent his childhood in Lviv, later leaving for Kyiv and then for Moscow where he graduated from the GITIS. From 1981 to 1986, he lived in Kyiv picking up a job at the local Variety Theatre. In 1990, he started working for the radio station Echo of Moscow where he launched the Bomond programme. In 2016, he obtained Ukrainian citizenship. As of 2020, Ganapolsky hosted a talk show named Ekho Ukrayiny on Pryamiy kanal and, until the radio station's closure in March 2022, several radio programmes on Echo of Moscow.

References 

1953 births
Living people
Ukrainian journalists
People listed in Russia as foreign agents
Echo of Moscow radio presenters
Russian emigrants to Ukraine